FK Viktoria Žižkov is one of the oldest football clubs in the Czech Republic, from Žižkov (since 1922 part of Prague). It plays in the Bohemian Football League, the third tier of football in the country. The club won the Czechoslovak First League title in the 1927–28 season. It has also won two editions of the Czech Cup.

History

Early years
The team was founded by students in 1903 in the town of Žižkov (since 1922 part of Prague). At that time the students chose red and white striped shirts as their colours in honour of the colours of the Flag of Bohemia. Those same colours remain today. Viktoria's main successes fall into the period between the world wars — until 1948 it was the third most successful Czechoslovak club, winning the Czechoslovak championship in 1928 and finishing as runners-up in 1929. It won the Czechoslovak Cup in 1913, 1914, 1916, 1921, 1929, 1933, and 1940, and came runners-up in 1919 and 1920. It successes gained international recognition, even as a result, giving the name to the Polish club Victoria Jaworzno.

Post-war era
After the Second World War and the beginning of communism in 1948 the club descended to the lower leagues and they didn't rejoin the top flight until 1993. In the 1950s the club underwent several name changes as a result of which the club briefly lost its historic name Viktoria; Sokol (1950), Sokol ČSAD (1951) and after a merger with Avia Čakovice the club was called TJ Slavoj Žižkov, a name which lasted until 1965 when the historic name was restored.

1990s and 2000s
In 1993 Viktoria was promoted again to the highest league as a result of the Velvet Divorce and the Slovak clubs walking away to form their own league. Viktoria was very successful between 1993 and 2003, competing in four European cups. Žižkov has won the national knock-out cup for the eighth time in 1994 and finished as runners-up in 1995.

In 2001 Viktoria Žižkov won their ninth cup in history followed by   knocking Scottish team Rangers out of the UEFA Cup in 2002, going through on the away goals rule after extra time at Ibrox. The team finished third in the league on two more occasions, in 2002 and 2003.

In 2004, after a string of poor results and a corruption scandal, the team was relegated again to the second league. In 2007 the team successfully made it back to the Czech First League, finishing the season as runaway champions of the 2nd league. After finishing mid-table in their first season back in the top flight, in 2009 they were relegated back to the second league after struggling all season, bouncing back to the top flight by again gaining promotion from the 2nd league, this time as Runners-up, two seasons later (2011).

2007–08 season
Žižkov's first season back in the Czech First League proved to be one of successful consolidation, the team finishing in a creditable 10th place, whilst also reaching the quarter final stage of the knock out cup. One of the highlights of the season was a 3–0 away win at Slavia, inflicting their only home defeat on the eventual champions. A 1–1 pre-Christmas home draw with Slavia was perhaps just as important however, the point being gained with a last minute Richard Kalod goal.

Žižkov's home form was the mainstay of their season, indeed they won 5 of their 7 post-Christmas matches. The final game of the season saw them gain a 1–0 victory over Mladá Boleslav, with another Kalod goal, thereby gaining their only double of the season, having also gained a 1–0 win against Boleslav on the opening day of the season. Top scorer for the season was Petr Švancara, who scored 6 goals.

2008–09 season
Petr Švancara won Czech Television's goal of 2008 (gol roku), with his stunning individual effort to open the scoring in Žižkov's 4–2 home victory against FK Bohemians Prague (Střížkov). This proved to be one of the few highlights in a disappointing season that saw Žižkov finish bottom of the league and hence relegated to the 2nd league once more. During the season three different managers were employed, which certainly did not help continuity. However the departure of good quality younger players, such as Ondřej Kušnír to Sparta Prague, at the start of the season, to be replaced by older, journeyman, players was a major factor.

2010–11 season
Žižkov gained promotion from the 2nd league by finishing as runners-up to FK Dukla Prague. The main strength of their promotion push turned out to be away performances, which were by far the best in the league. Some poor early season home performances threatened to unship the promotion push but these picked up in the latter part of the season, a 1–0 win over MFK Karviná, with a late goal by team captain Tomáš Procházka being hailed as a critical victory. Star player of the season was undoubtedly Czech U21 goalkeeper Tomáš Vaclík. Also of note were the performances of Miroslav Marković who finished as the club's top scorer for the season and second in the league overall, who departed after the end of the season.

2011–12 season
Žižkov parted company with coach Martin Pulpit on 23 November with the club having scored just seven points from the opening 14 rounds of the 2011–12 Czech First League. In January, with the club bottom of the league, it was revealed that only ten players from the first half of the season were still at the club. A particular loss was goalkeeper Tomáš Vaclík moving to Sparta Prague. Žižkov finished bottom of the league with 19 points, and were relegated to the second division.

Historical names
 1903 – Sportovní kroužek Viktoria Žižkov
 1904 – SK Viktoria Žižkov
 1950 – Sokol Viktoria Žižkov
 1951 – Sokol ČSAD Žižkov
 1952 – TJ Slavoj Žižkov (after merger with Avia Čakovice)
 1965 – TJ Viktoria Žižkov
 1973 – TJ Viktoria Žižkov Strojimport
 1982 – TJ Viktoria Žižkov PSO
 1992 – FK Viktoria Žižkov

Stadium

The club's original stadium was located in the Ohrada region, but this was closed down in 1928. Viktoria's present ground, FK Viktoria Stadion, was opened in 1952 and is situated on Seifertova třída, just a short walk (one tram stop) from Prague's main railway station. It has a capacity of 5,037. In 2007 the club opened a fanshop at the ground for the sale of club mementos.

Players

Current squad
.

Out on loan

Notable former players

In popular culture
The very popular Czech 1931 comedy film Muži v offsidu is centred largely on the culture and fans of Viktoria Žižkov and features unique footage of several matches from that time. The book, on which the story is based, was written by Karel Poláček.

The Czech film actor Vlasta Burian played as the regular goalkeeper for Žižkov around 1916 before setting out on his acting career. A plaque in FK Viktoria Stadion now commemorates his appearances for the club.

Managers

 Vladimír Táborský (1993)
 Jiří Kotrba (1993–95)
 František Kopač (1995–96)
 Jaroslav Hřebík (1996)
 Július Bielik (1997–98)
 Jiří Štol (1998–99)
 Petr Uličný (1999)
 Zdeněk Ščasný (1999–02)
 Vítězslav Lavička (July 2002 – Sept 2003)
 Günter Bittengel (Nov 2003 – June 2004)
 Stanislav Levý (July 2004 – Dec 2004)
 František Kopač (2005)
 Stanislav Griga (July 2007 – Sept 2008)
 Josef Csaplár (Sept 2008 – Nov 2008)
 Zdeněk Ščasný (Nov 2008 – Dec 2010)
 Vlastimil Petržela (June 2009 – May 2010)
 Martin Pulpit (July 2010 – Nov 2011)
 Roman Nádvorník (Dec 2011 – Mar 2013)
 Giancarlo Favarin (Mar 2013 – June 2013)
 Jindřich Trpišovský (July 2013 – May 2015)
 Roman Veselý (July 2015 – Sept 2015)
 Zdeněk Hašek (Oct 2015 – Nov 2016)
 David Vavruška (Dec 2016 – Oct 2017)
 Bohuslav Pilný (Oct 2017 – May 2018)
 Petr Mikolanda (Jun 2018 – Oct 2018)
 Miloš Sazima (Oct 2018 – May 2019)
 Zdeněk Hašek (May 2019 – Nov 2020)
 David Vavruška (Nov 2020 – Dec 2020)
 David Oulehla (Dec 2020 – Oct 2021)
 Martin Pulpit (Oct 2021 – Apr 2022)
 Daniel Veselý (Apr 2022 – May 2022)
 Václav Kotal (May 2022 – )

History in domestic competitions

 Seasons spent at Level 1 of the football league system: 14
 Seasons spent at Level 2 of the football league system: 14
 Seasons spent at Level 3 of the football league system: 10
 Seasons spent at Level 4 of the football league system: 2

Czech Republic

Notes

History in European competitions

UEFA Cup

Mitropa Cup
In 1928 Žižkov took part in the Mitropa Cup, reaching the semi-final stage, where they lost in a play off to SK Rapid Wien after the initial two-legs between the teams produced a tie. At the quarter final stage Žižkov knocked out Građanski Zagreb (later to become Dinamo Zagreb) over two legs, winning the home tie 6–1.

Honours
Czechoslovak First League
Champions: 1927–28
Czech Cup
Champions: 1993–94, 2000–01
Czech 2. Liga (second tier)
Champions: 2006–07

References

 
Football clubs in the Czech Republic
Zizkov, Viktoria
Association football clubs established in 1903
Zizkov, Viktoria
Zizkov, Viktoria
Football clubs in Czechoslovakia
Football clubs in Austria-Hungary
Žižkov